Offen may refer to:

Offen, Bergen
Anna Katharina von Offen (1624-1702) German courtier and royal governess
Bernard Offen (1929-) 
Helga Offen (1951-2020) German volleyball player
Ron Offen (1930-2010) American poet